The Graham County Railroad was a logging railroad that began operations in 1925 and operated just over 15 miles of track.

History 
The Graham County Railroad was a logging railroad chartered in 1905 to connect Robbinsville, North Carolina, to the Southern Railway at Topton, North Carolina. Soon after the tracks were starting to be laid, the railroad purchased a used steam locomotive in need of repairs. The railroad sent the locomotive to Asheville, North Carolina, for repairs, but a flood hit the area and the locomotive was washed away and never found. The flood also washed away much of the existing track, halting all progress on the line. Then in 1925, the railroad finally became operational. Sometime in the 1960s, Shay #1926 lost its original number plate and it inherited the number plate from a scrapped narrow gauge Shay locomotive (serial number 3229). The railroad began doing excursions in 1966 with shay #1926 while #1925 handled the freight traffic. In 1967, the Bemis Lumber Company mill burned to the ground and when it was rebuilt, the mill began using trucks. The railroad continued on with local freight. By this point, the railroad's track was in poor condition which caused a derailment at least every 3 days.

In late 1968, Shay #1925 was on a mixed train lost its air brakes and turned onto her engineer's side at Nantahala Gorge, damaging her cab and water tank. Over the winter, the railroad then took the cab and water tank of #1926 to repair #1925 and the Bear Creek operations continued in 1969 with another Shay they bought, the #1923, a 2-Truck-Shay. This Shay formerly worked for the Conasauga River Lumber Company as their #112 until it was sold to the Bear Creek Scenic Railroad in 1966. On August 14, 1970, with freight traffic dwindling and the carpet mill closing, the railroad ceased all operations.

In 1973, the railroad reopened when Burlington Industries bought the line. #1925 took over the excursion runs of the Bear Creek Scenic Railroad. while a General Electric diesel handled most of the freight operations, but also ceased operations in March 1975 when a flood washed out a bridge. In May 1975, #1925 ran the last steam-powered revenue freight train. In 1982, the railroad re-opened operations with an EMD SW8 diesel locomotive that originally worked for the Atlantic Coast Line Railroad. The line finally shut down in 1983 and the tracks were taken up in 1987.

Motive Power
The railroad operated two C class shay locomotives numbered 1925 and 1926, which they were numbered the same years they were built. The railroad also had one other steam locomotive numbered 1923. Steam locomotive # 2147 was used for display. The Railroad at one time also owned a 2-6-2 Prairie.

References

 
Graham County Railroad
Graham County Railroad
1925 establishments in North Carolina
1970 disestablishments in North Carolina